This is the list of films produced in Yugoslavia in the 1970s. For an alphabetical list of Yugoslav films see :Category:Yugoslav films.

1970s

See also
List of Serbian films
List of Croatian films
List of Bosnia-Herzegovina films
List of Macedonian films
List of Slovenian films
List of Montenegrin films

References

External links
 Yugoslav film at the Internet Movie Database
 Paul Branko, "Two Roots of Yugoslav Cinema", in: ART IN SOCIETY No. 3 (http://www.art-in-society.de/AS3/Y-film.html)
 Wolfram Schuette, "Zelimir Zilnik's 'Early Works'", in: ART IN SOCIETY No. 3 (http://www.art-in-society.de/AS3/Schuette.shtml)

1970s
Films
Lists of 1970s films